was a town located in Imizu District, Toyama Prefecture, Japan.

On November 1, 2005, Kosugi, along with the city of Shinminato, the towns of Daimon and Ōshima, the village of Shimo (all from Imizu District), was merged to create the city of Imizu and no longer exists as an independent municipality.

Dissolved municipalities of Toyama Prefecture
Imizu, Toyama